The Levatores costarum, twelve in number on either side, are small tendinous and fleshy bundles, which arise from the ends of the transverse processes of the seventh cervical and upper eleven thoracic vertebrae

They pass obliquely downward and laterally, like the fibers of the Intercostales externi, and each is inserted into the outer surface of the rib immediately below the vertebra from which it takes origin, between the tubercle and the angle (Levatores costarum breves).

Each of the four lower muscles divides into two fasciculi, one of which is inserted as above described; the other passes down to the second rib below its origin (Levatores costarum longi).

They have a role in forceful inspiration.

See also
 Iliocostalis
 Interspinales muscles
 Intertransversarii muscle
 Longissimus
 Spinalis

References

Back anatomy
Muscles of the torso